Omobranchus ferox, the gossamer blenny or the fang-toothed blenny, is a species of combtooth blenny found brackish waters in Africa and Asia.  This species can reach a length of  SL.

References

ferox
Taxa named by Albert William Herre
Fish described in 1927